Aloha Hawaii is a 1958 Australian television variety show which aired fortnightly.

It started on 8 July and was hosted by a black Australian, Harry Willis. Regular guests included Johnny Wade and his Hawaiians and hula dancer Maisie Lutani.

References

External links

1958 Australian television series debuts
Australian variety television shows